Halstead is a village and civil parish in the Sevenoaks District of Kent, England. It is located 4.7 miles south east of Orpington & 6.1 miles north west of Sevenoaks, adjacent to the Kent border with Greater London. The population of the civil parish at the 2011 census was 1,607.

The name Halstead is derived from the Old English hald (refuge, shelter) and stede (site, place), meaning 'safe place' or 'place of refuge'. The parish church is dedicated to St Margaret. Halstead Community Primary School is located in the village.

Botanist and photographer Anne Atkins lived since 1841 to her death at Halstead Place, were she is buried. Author Edith Nesbit spent some of her adolescence in Halstead during the 1870s and her book The Railway Children is thought to be based on her time living in a house, Halstead Hall, whose garden is about a mile and a half from the railway line.

The parish is adjacent to Fort Halstead, a government defence research centre that is thought to have developed Britain's first atomic bomb.

Transport

Rail
The nearest National Rail station to Halstead is Knockholt, located 1.4 miles away.

Buses
Halstead is serves by London Buses routes R5 and R10 which provide connections to Orpington, Cudham and Knockholt.

See also 
Halstead, a town in Essex

References 

 Hasted, Edward - "The History of Kent" pp319–322 (1788, reprinted 1972).
 Kitchener, Geoffrey - "Halstead in Kent - An Historical Guide" (1978).

External links

Halstead Parish Council

 

Villages in Kent
Civil parishes in Kent